The name Ambigolimax nyctelius (and similarly Lehmannia nyctelia and Limax nyctelius) has been used to refer to several species of air-breathing land slugs (terrestrial pulmonate gastropod molluscs) in the family Limacidae. An article published in 2022 revealed this confusion and furthermore showed that the original description applied to a slug species in a different family. The above names are therefore no longer appropriate and care is need to interpret the meaning of earlier usages.

The following five species were confused:
Letourneuxia nyctelia (family Arionidae) is the slug originally described. Until 2022 it was mostly known as Letourneuxia numidica;
Ambigolimax waterstoni is believed native in Algeria but has been reported also from South Africa, Australia, New Zealand, Elba and some Scottish botanic gardens;
Ambigolimax parvipenis is a widespread invasive species in the British Isles and California, and has been reported also from Spain, France, Greece and Arizona;
Lehmannia carpatica occurs mostly at high altitudes along the chain of the Carpathian Mountains and in other ranges further south from Albania to Bulgaria;
Simroth and Pollonera used the species name nyctelia for a poorly known species from North Africa attributed to the genus Malacolimax.

References

 
nyctelius
Taxa named by Jules René Bourguignat
Gastropods described in 1861